The Ladbury Church, near Dazey, North Dakota, was built in 1899 in Late Gothic Revival style. It was listed on the National Register of Historic Places in 2005.

Alternate names associated with the site are Union Congregational Church, Ladbury Church, Kensal Church, Sibley Trail Union Congregational Church, and Sunnyside Church and Cemetery.

References

Churches on the National Register of Historic Places in North Dakota
Gothic Revival church buildings in North Dakota
Churches completed in 1899
National Register of Historic Places in Barnes County, North Dakota
Congregational churches in North Dakota
1899 establishments in North Dakota